Shazia Mirza is an English comedian, actress, and writer. She is best known for her stand-up comedy, and her articles in British newspapers The Guardian and The Daily Telegraph.

Early life and education
Mirza was born in Birmingham, England, the eldest daughter of Muslim Pakistani parents who moved to Birmingham, England in the 1960s.

Mirza read Biochemistry at the University of Manchester and then achieved a Postgraduate Certificate in Education at Goldsmiths, University of London. Before beginning her career in comedy, Mirza was a science teacher at Langdon Park School, where she taught Dylan Mills, now known as the grime pioneer Dizzee Rascal. She later attended Rose Bruford College, where she studied acting part time while working as a supply teacher, taking the final year of the course full time.

Career

Stand-up
Her comedy is said to push barriers and as a comedian, she is often referred to as 'brave'.

Writing

Mirza was a columnist for The Guardian between 2008 and 2010. In the past she has written columns for The New Statesman and Dawn newspaper.

Television and radio
She was a regular panelist on the Channel 5 topical discussion series The Wright Stuff, as well as appearing on other TV shows

In April 2007, she presented a documentary on BBC Three called F*** Off, I'm a Hairy Woman.

Mirza has also appeared in reality game shows Celebrity The Island with Bear Grylls on Channel 4 (2017), and in 2018, the Channel 5 show Celebs in Solitary.

Recognition
She was recognized as one of the BBC's 100 women of 2013.

References

External links

Living people
English people of Pakistani descent
Schoolteachers from the West Midlands
English stand-up comedians
Comedians from Birmingham, West Midlands
English women comedians
British comedians of Pakistani descent
English columnists
The Guardian journalists
BBC 100 Women
British women columnists
Alumni of the University of Manchester
Alumni of Rose Bruford College
21st-century English comedians
Year of birth missing (living people)
1970s births